Delémont railway station serves the municipality of Delémont, the capital city of the Canton of Jura, Switzerland.  Opened in 1875, the station is owned and operated by Swiss Federal Railways.  It forms part of the Jura railway (Basel SBB–Biel/Bienne), and is also the junction for the Delémont–Delle railway, a cross-border link with France.

The Delémont roundhouse, located within the station yard, is listed as a Swiss heritage site of national significance (class A).

History
The station was opened on 23 September 1875, together with the rest of the Basel–Delémont section of the Jura railway.  Just over a year later, on 15 October 1876, the station became a junction, when the Delémont–Glovelier section of the Delémont–Delle railway was opened. During World War II, the railway station was accidentally bombed on 8 September 1944 by the Allies, injuring a number of railway employees.

Location
Delémont railway station is situated on the southwestern edge of the city centre.

Facilities
The station offers a number of services, such as ticket sales, Western Union, café, kiosk, and shops.

Services
The following services stop at Delémont:

 InterCity: hourly service over the Basel–Biel/Bienne line from Biel/Bienne to Basel SBB.
 RegioExpress: hourly service over the Delémont–Delle line to Meroux (in France) and the Basel–Biel/Bienne line to Biel/Bienne.
 Basel S-Bahn : hourly service over the Delémont–Delle line to Porrentruy and the Basel–Biel/Bienne line to Olten.

See also

History of rail transport in Switzerland
Rail transport in Switzerland

References

External links
 
 
 Interactive station plan (Delémont)

Railway stations in Switzerland opened in 1875
Railway stations in the canton of Jura
Swiss Federal Railways stations
Delémont